Rosario Enrique Cota Carrazco (born 12 September 1995) is a Mexican professional footballer who plays as a left-back.

References

External links
 
 

Living people
1995 births
Mexican footballers
Association football defenders
Liga MX players
Liga Premier de México players
Cruz Azul footballers
Club Universidad Nacional footballers
Footballers from Sinaloa
Sportspeople from Culiacán
Cruz Azul Hidalgo footballers